The Society for the Study of French History (SSFH) is a society in the United Kingdom established to promote research in French history.

The society was founded in 1968 by Richard Bonney and granted charitable status in 1992.

It publishes the journal French History and holds an annual conference.

The society's trustees include Richard Bonney, Malcolm Crook, William Doyle, Michael Jones and Pamela Pilbeam.

References

External links
  of the SSFH

1968 establishments in the United Kingdom
Organizations established in 1968
Historical societies of the United Kingdom
Historiography of France